Ovoot Airport is an airport located at Ovoot Tolgoi / Nariin Sukhait, Ömnögovi Province, Mongolia. It handles domestic scheduled air traffic for the mining complex, and is served by several domestic scheduled passenger flights every week.

Information 
Ovoot Airport is located 320 kilometers southwest of the regional capital of the Dalanzadgad, and 950 kilometers south of the national capital of Ulan Bator.

Airlines and destinations

See also 

 List of airports in Mongolia
 List of airlines of Mongolia

References

External links

Airports in Mongolia